Folk practices prevalent in Punjab incorporate local mysticism and refers to the beliefs and practices strictly indigenous to the Punjabi people, of the Punjab region including ancestral worship, veneration of saints, and local festivals. There are many shrines in Punjab which represent the folk religion of the Punjab region which is a discourse between different organised religions. These shrines represent inter-communal dialogue and a distinct form of cultural practice of saint veneration.

Roger Ballard (1999) classifies Punjab's folk religion into the kismetic (misfortune caused by fate, or supernatural beings) dimension of Punjabi religious life, alongside its panth (inspirational leadership), dharam (divine laws), and qaum (community construction) elements. The kismetic belief holds that misfortune can be caused by both unfulfilled, jealous spirits like bhuts (ghosts), dhags, jinns, and churails (witches), as well as by other people through the use of magic, including spells and incantations, and the evil eye (nazar). Various folk beliefs are also attached to almost all birds and animals, which serve as omens, vessels of powers, or sacrifices.

Alongside beliefs in folk heroes and ancestors, belief in mostly malevolent spirits, often resulting from untimely deaths and motivated by envy from unfulfilled desires relating to life milestones like childlessness, indulge in varying degrees of harm on the living. The nazar, causing misfortune and damage via jealous gazes, is most often targeted at one's family members, land and crops, and personal property, and protected against by amulets, customs, and various social mores, including humility.

The practice of folk beliefs are often accompanied by what has been called dhadi or folk ballads, that complement more institutionalized music forms like kirtan and qawwali.

Purposes 
Such functional, fluid folk religion often takes form in seeking out help in the form of those regarded as healers and spiritual masters, often in times of anxiety, grief, or anger, in regards to ancestors, family, and death, and within "cognitive frameworks of illness and healing."

Position in society
Folk beliefs are most widespread in rural areas, and this "popular religion" has been described as the religious practices of Punjab's "subordinate social sector," with miracle-working saints, malevolent deities, evil spirits, witchcraft and other occult practices, and village sites, where these practices are often centered. Saint veneration often revolves around pirs, and along with the patronage of shrines whose lore drew freely from the normative traditions of formalized religions, was practiced syncretically across religious lines.

The shrines of such folk heroes as Gugga Pir and Sakhi Sarwar are made and managed by followers who are often excluded from frameworks of formalized "high" religions in East Punjab, as embodied by the Jat influence on Sikhism, by Brahminical Hinduism, or by Sharia Islam, and fall outside of the scope of such hegemonic institutions, especially as religious identity has become increasingly polarized. The sharpening of religious boundaries through revivalist and reformist movements in the region during colonial times also had an effect on the position of folk beliefs in Punjabi society, which often transcended such boundaries.

The first formal studies of Punjabi folk religion took place in 1971.

Despite being a crucial part of Punjabi religion, in which the inexplicable can be rationalized, its dismissal as superstition and the fact that it defies religious classification has meant that it has remained understudied. Its transcendence of religious boundaries is manifested in its eclectic integration of Sufi, bhakti, and tradition beliefs in the occult, possession, and exorcisms. According to Ballard, there is prejudice against this dimension of Punjab religious practice.

According to cultural historian Dr. Anne Murphy,

Punjabi folk cosmology
Bhatti and Michon (2004), in their article Folk Practice in Punjab, published in the Journal of Punjab Studies by the University of California, believe that in Punjabi folk cosmology, the universe is divided into three realms:

Devlok is the realm of the gods, saints and ancestors, existing in akash, the sky. Ancestors can become gods or saints.

Punjabi ancestral worship

Jathera—ancestral shrines

Jats, a large group of former nomads, had begun to turn to settled agriculture around the thirteenth century in central Punjab, facilitated by region's fertility and the use of the Persian water wheel. They brought with them their own beliefs centered on the worship of deities like Sakhi Sarwar and Gugga Pir, as well as their own independent social customs like widow remarriage and reverence for clan leaders, or vaderas, while building relationships with settled society, though often placed in the lower rungs of caste society. The Jats had a long-standing social tradition of egalitarianism.

Their institution of jatheras and the veneration of vaderas and folk figures exist at the boundaries of the major organized religions of the region, coexisting comfortably alongside religious identities, and adding to Punjabi cultural identity, continuing to thrive and not fitting neatly into any clearly delineated, reified categories.

Practice
According to Bhatti and Michon (2004), a jathera is a shrine constructed to commemorate and show respect to the founding common ancestor of a surname and all subsequent common clan ancestors. Whenever a founder of a village dies, a shrine is raised to him on the outskirts of the village and a jandi tree is planted there. A village may have many such shrines.

The jathera can be named after the founder of the surname or the village. However, many villages have unnamed jathera. In some families, the founder of the jathera is also a saint. In such instances, the founder has a dual role of being the head of a jathera (who is venerated by his descendants) and also of being a saint (such as Baba Jogi Pir; who can be worshipped by any one).

Punjabi people believe that members of a surname all hail from one common ancestor. A surname in Punjabi is called a gaut or gotra.

Members of a surname are then subdivided into smaller clans comprising related members who can trace their family tree. Typically, a clan represents people related within at least seven generations but can be more.

In ancient times, it was normal for a village to comprise members of one surname. When people moved to form a new village, they continued to pay homage to the founding jathera. This is still the case for many people who may have new jathera in their villages but still pay homage to the founding ancestor of the entire surname.

Over time, Punjabi villages changed their composition whereby families from different surnames came to live together. A village therefore can have one jathera which can be communally used by members of different surnames but has the founder of the village as the named ancestor or many jathera can be built to represent the common ancestors of specific surnames.

When members of a clan form a new village, they continue to visit the jathera in the ancestral village. If this is not possible, a link is brought from the old jathera to construct a new jathera in the new village.

People visit the jathera when getting married, the 15th of the Indian month and sometimes on the first Sunday of an Indian month. The descendants of the elder go to a pond and dig earth and make shivlinga and some put it on the mound of their jathera and offer ghee and flowers to the Jathera.So, It is a form of shivlinga puja also. In some villages it is customary to offer flour.

Shrines
Bhatti (2000) states that there are shrines dedicated to various saints, gods and goddesses in Punjab which he has studied by reference to Punjabi folk religion. These include Sakhi Sarwar, Seetla Mata and Gugga.
There are many shrines which represent the folk practices of the Punjab region. Snehi (2015) states that such shrines represent a discourse between different organised religions.

According to Singh and Gaur (2009), these shrines represent inter-communal dialogue and a distinct form of cultural practice of saint veneration. Rouse (1988) regards pirs as the folk-religion representatives and fakirs as the caretakers of shrines. These categories are discussed in an Islamic context. Weekes (1984) discussing Islam states that:
"Punjabi folk religion weaves a rich variety of local mysticism — such as beliefs in the evil eye , the predictions of astrologers and the potency of amulets and potions — into the scriptural , universalizing traditions of Islam propounded by the ulama."

Various other saints are also venerated in Punjab such as Khawaja Khidr is a river spirit of wells and streams. He is mentioned in the Sikandar-nama as the saint who presides over the well of immortality, and is revered by many faiths. He is sometimes pictured as an old man dressed in green, and is believed to ride upon a fish. His principal shrine is on an island of the Indus River by Bhakkar in Punjab, Pakistan. Gugga Pir is a hero-deity from whom protection against snakebites is sought. He is one of an array of heroic, martial, and saintly figures of the region venerated for folk purposes. The fair known as Chhapar Mela is organised annually.

Many villages in Punjab, India and Pakistan, have shrines of Sakhi Sarwar who is more popularly referred to as Lakha Data Pir. A shrine of Sakhi Sarwar is situated in district Dera Ghazi Khan in Punjab, of Pakistan, where an annual fair is held in March. A 9-day fair is organised every year in Mukandpur, Punjab, India.

Other shrines are in honour of Seetla Mata who is worshiped for protection against childhood diseases with notable fair being held annually in Ludhiana district and is known as the Jarag mela; Gorakhnath who was an 11th to 12th centuryNath yogi and connected to Shaivism; and Puran Bhagat who is a revered saint in the Punjab region and other areas of the subcontinent. People visit Puran's well located in Sialkot, especially childless women travel from places as far as Quetta and Karachi.

See also
Folk religion
Elite religion

Gallery

References

Notes

 
Indian religions
Punjabi folklore
Punjabi culture
Asian ethnic religion